Pulosari is a village located in Kalapanunggal district of the Sukabumi regency in West Java, Indonesia

Geography
Pulosari Village is located at coordinates 6 ° 47'10.9 "South Latitude 106 ° 39'33.0" East Longitude. The village borders the Mount Halimun Salak National Park in the north, then borders the Makasari and Gunung Endut village in the East, borders Palasari Girang and Walangsari village in the South, and borders the Kabandungan village from Kabandungan district in the west.

The total area of Pulosari Village is 2,632 ha/m^2 which consists of settlements covering an area of 65.27 ha / m^2, rice fields covering 286.4 ha / m^2, plantation land covering an area of 430 ha / m^2, burial land covering an area of  3 ha / m^2, and yards. an area of 24.1 ha / m^2.

Tourism
Pulosari Village offers natural attractions such as Curug Batu Bodas and Bukit Cinta.

Curug Batu Bodas 

Curug Batu Bodas is located around 500 meter from Kampung Cigoong. The origin of the name "bodas" which means "white" or "holy" in Sundanese is inspired by a tall white rock like a cliff. Hence, Curug Batu Bodas means White Stone Waterfall. Approaching the destination, you will find a natural spot called Tangga Seribu or the Thousand Stairs that gives you breathtaking scenery of the village

Local residents who have a strong animism belief, recognizing the waterfall as a place of pilgrimage for their ancestors. Tourists who want to visit the waterfall are encouraged to follow the local customs procedures because there are areas in the waterfall that need to be kept "pure" so that they are not allowed to eat or swim in pools or certain areas other than what has been allowed by the residents, namely the Kahuripan and Cipabeasan water which are said to be used for bathing if you have a desire. However, some residents expressed the cons of inviting tourists such as garbage dumped carelessly or used as a dating location because of their desire to maintain the “cleanliness” of Batu Bodas. Access to the waterfall is still difficult and does not allow cars

Curug Batu Bodas has officially become a natural tourist attraction in July 2020. Residents open this nature tourism in the hope that it can increase the income of the village economy and reduce unemployment. Residents also hope that the government will help develop facilities that can accommodate tourists in the future; such as toilets, rest areas, and prayer rooms.

Resources
Pulosari Village, especially Kampung Cigoong has great potential for palm sugar plantations because of its uniqueness where the villagers agree to share the palm sugar trees that are located around Curug Batu Bodas with its residents; management. Each resident manages a tree and has the freedom to take advantage of the tree by either making juice, sugar, selling and turning, etc. The price of one toros is five pieces or fifty thousand rupiah.

Agricultural and plantation products marketed from Pulosari include bananas, papaya, nutmeg, green beans, eggplant, cucumber, chili, cassava, and rice. The livestock sector is dominated mostly by poultry.

References

External links
 Kalapanunggal District Official Site

Sukabumi Regency
Villages in West Java